Lunar Soup is the second album by Japanese song writer Ayako Ikeda. It was released in Japan on July 6, 2005.

Track listing
All lead vocals were sung by Ayako Ikeda, and arranged by Tatoo.

  - 3:54
 Timeless - 4:45
  - 4:52
  - 3:54
  - 5:34
  - 5:01
  - 4:18
  - 4:37
 Silver Moon - 4:37
 I will - 4:41
  - 3:37
  - 5:14
  - 4:48
 Life - 4:22

Personnel
Ayako Ikeda - lead and background vocals, wurlitzer
Akihisa Kominato - bamboo flute
Yasuharu Nakanishi - piano
Kumiko Hasegawa - piano, background vocals
Tatoo - piano, keyboard, rhodes, background vocals
Chica - violin
Keigo Shiga - violin
Mio Okamura - violin
To-ru Meki - guitar
Taguchi Penguin - bass
Tomoyuki Yamada - percussion
Katsumi Takabayashi - drums
Ria (Sara de Patti) - background vocals
The PAPA X All Stars - background vocals

Ayako Ikeda albums
2005 albums